The Golescu family is the notable noble family from what is now Romania, whose members played important role in political life of the country.

Notable members 

Dinicu Golescu (1777–1830), writer
Zoe Golescu (1792–1879), revolutionary
Ștefan Golescu (1809–1874), politician
Nicolae Golescu (1810–1877), politician
Alexandru G. Golescu (1819–1881), politician